Rasoul Mirtoroghi (born February 20, 1984) is an Iranian footballer who plays for Sanat Naft Abadan F.C. in the IPL.

Club career
In 2009, Mirtoroghi joined Sanat Naft Abadan F.C. after spending the previous seasons at Mes Kerman in the Iran Pro League.

Assist Goals

References

1984 births
Living people
Sanat Mes Kerman F.C. players
Sanat Naft Abadan F.C. players
Iranian footballers
Association football defenders
Sportspeople from Gilan province